Calothamnus gilesii  is a plant in the myrtle family, Myrtaceae and is endemic to the south-west of Western Australia. It is an erect, usually compact shrub with fine, pine-like foliage and which produces cluster of red flowers from June to January. (In 2014 Craven, Edwards and Cowley proposed that the species be renamed Melaleuca gilesii.)

Description

The flowers are bright red and arranged in small groups. The stamens are arranged in 5 claw-like bundles. Flowering occurs in late spring and summer and is followed by fruits which are woody capsules.

Taxonomy and naming
Calothamnus gilesii was first formally described by Victorian Government Botanist Ferdinand von Mueller in 1876 in the tenth volume of Fragmenta Phytographiae Australiae. It is not clear whether the specific epithet (gilesii) honours Ernest Giles who conducted major expeditions in central Australia or Ernest Giles's friend,  Christopher Giles, both of whom made collections for Mueller. Mueller noted that the collection was made by "Giles and Young".

Distribution and habitat
Calothamnus gilesii is widespread in the drier areas of south-western Western Australia including the Avon Wheatbelt, Coolgardie, Geraldton Sandplains, Great Victoria Desert, Mallee, Murchison, Nullarbor Plain and Yalgoo biogeographic regions. It grows on sandplains and stony ridges.

Conservation
This species is classified as "not threatened" by the Western Australian government department of parks and wildlife.

Use in horticulture
In cultivation, the species adapts well to harsh, hot situations. It tolerates some dryness and moderate frost.

References

gilesii
Myrtales of Australia
Plants described in 1876
Endemic flora of Western Australia
Taxa named by Ferdinand von Mueller